Brode is a former settlement in the Municipality of Moravče in central Slovenia. It is now part of the village of Mošenik. The area is part of the traditional region of Upper Carniola. The municipality is now included in the Central Slovenia Statistical Region.

Geography
Brode lies in the southwestern part of the village of Mošenik, in a wooded area south of the main part of the village and west of Mošeniščnica Creek.

History
Brode had a population of five living in one house in 1900. Brode  was annexed by Mošenik in 1953, ending its existence as an independent settlement.

References

External links

Brode on Geopedia

Populated places in the Municipality of Moravče
Former settlements in Slovenia